J.L. Thompson and Sons was a shipyard on the River Wear, Sunderland, which produced ships from the mid-18th century until the 1980s. The world-famous Liberty Ship was among the designs to be created, produced and manufactured at the yard's base at North Sands.

History

The founder of J.L. Thompson and Sons was Robert Thompson, the son of a Master Mariner, who was born in 1797. As a boy he had enjoyed a busy life on the River Wear, playing among the keels, and at 18 he started work as an apprentice shipwright. He spent his evenings, however, learning draughtsmanship on his kitchen floor and, by the age of 22, had built several craft in a berth below the Lambton Drops.

Robert's first association with North Sands came in 1820, when he joined forces with seven business associates to build a 12 keel vessel in just six weeks. But it took him another 17 years to launch his own company, going into business with his three sons – all apprenticed as shipwrights – at Washington Stays. Unfortunately, the depression which gripped Britain at this time quickly caused the firm's collapse, and the sons were forced to take positions at other firms. Down, but not out, Robert decided to fight back. His firm, Robert Thompson & Sons, was launched once more on 13 February 1846. It was to prove a huge success.

North Sands became the new home of the firm and, with a staff of just eight, they built a brig of 12 keels – Pearl – in 11 weeks – with work starting at 4am each day. Pearl brought in a £300 profit and helped establish the yard's reputation for good shipbuilding. The yard's first ship, Vencedora, soon followed. "The launch of Vencedora was the occasion of great rejoicing," states a centenary brochure published by Thompsons in 1946. "The apprentices followed the ancient custom and went through the ceremony of ducking and plunging into the water as soon as the ship was safely launched. Carpenters allowances at this time were a pint of beer in the forenoon for caulking, a pint for the keel seam and three pints of beer on the launching day."

A Partnership Deal was signed for the yard in 1853, with the firm now including Robert senior and junior, as well as Thompson's two other sons, Joseph and John. Joseph, however, quickly found himself in charge following the retirement of Robert senior and junior, as well as John, between then and 1860. Already experienced in designing vessels, he devoted his energies to furthering the business, being joined by his own sons, Robert and Joseph, within a few years. The year 1870 was a particular highlight, as it saw the last wooden ship built at North Sands. It was named Peace to commemorate the end of the Franco-Prussian War. Iron ships were, by now, far more popular and the crafts which had flourished in the days of sail – mast, rope and sail making - were all affected by the steamer age. Thompsons underwent a major overhaul to prepare for metal vessels and in 1871, just after the finishing touches were made, its name was changed to Joseph L Thompson.

By the year 1880, the firm was in possession of the entire North Sands area, where seven shipyards had previously existed. Its 100th vessel was launched four years later. But, as its prosperity flourished, so the health of Joseph Thompson senior and junior declined. The senior Mr Thompson died in 1893, while his son was forced to retire. The business then passed to Robert Thompson, eldest son of Joseph, whose expert abilities as a shipbuilder were already recognised nationwide. The year 1896 saw the firm celebrate its Golden Jubilee in style, with ship number 336 being launched in January. The ship weighed 4,932 tonnes and measured – a giant when compared to the original Pearl – which was just .

World War I found Thompson's specialising in cargo vessels and Admiralty craft. King George V even paid a visit in June 1917, to praise the work being done. The depression which followed the war, however, hit Thompsons hard. Indeed, in 1923, for the first time in the firm's history, not a single ship was launched in a year. The yard managed to struggle back with orders the following year, but the "Hungry Thirties" saw depression hit the yard again and only a skeleton staff was kept on. After lying virtually idle for four years, it was decided that cheaper production, construction improvements and improved ship performances were the way forward. Under the direction of Major Robert Norman Thompson and his son, Robert Cyril Thompson, research led to the creation of a distinctive new ship model - the Liberty Ship. The first ship built to the design, Embassage, was launched in 1935 and created "exceptional interest" among ship owners. Orders, once again, flooded in.

The largest ship ever built at North Sands, the oil tanker Sandanger, followed in 1938, just before war work again took over the yard during World War II. Workers churned out 40 vessels during the war, a proud figure that was noted at the highest levels.  The King and Queen, Mrs Winston Churchill and the Duke of Kent were just three of the high-ranking visitors to tour the site. But Hitler's Luftwaffe managed to disrupt the work at times, bombing the site twice in May 1943.  A ship was sunk and the joiners’ shop severely damaged.  The year 1946 saw Britain once more at peace and staff at Thompson's celebrate its 100th anniversary.  A statement in the firm's anniversary brochure reads: "In the capable hands of those who today lead and control the fortunes of the firm, the aim still remains to give the best and deliver ships of the highest quality."

The neighbouring yard of John Crown & Sons Ltd was bought by Thompsons in its centenary year, to allow the building of larger and faster vessels.  In the 1960s, Thompson's spent millions of pounds expanding their capacity to build ships of up to 150,000 tons.  Bigger and bigger ships were built by workers throughout the next two decades, but the yard was eventually mothballed until 1986, when the ITM Challenger was built.  Today, the site is home to the University of Sunderland and the National Glass Centre.

See also
 Thompson family history
 Lady Elizabeth (1869) (1879)
 List of ship launches in 1905
 Liberty ship
 Park ship
 USS Culoga (AF-3)
 SS Drakensberg Castle
 National Glass Centre
 List of Liberty ships
 Silver Line (shipping company)
 Type C1 ship
 Type C2 ship
 Allied technological cooperation during World War II

References

External links
 

Defunct shipbuilding companies of England
Former defence companies of the United Kingdom
United Kingdom in World War I
United Kingdom in World War II
Maritime history of England

Shipbuilding companies of the City of Sunderland